Mark Reynolds (born 7 May 1987) is a Scottish professional footballer who plays as a defender for Scottish Championship club Cove Rangers. He began his career at Motherwell and has also played for Sheffield Wednesday, Aberdeen and Dundee United.

Club career

Motherwell
Reynolds started his career at hometown club Motherwell and made his debut on 3 May 2006, starting in a 1–0 win over relegated Livingston. He would then sign a two-year contract. The following season, he became a regular in the first team. His first goal came on 30 September 2006, in a 5–0 win over Kilmarnock and he scored his second later in the season in a 3–2 loss against Dundee United on 16 December 2006. In November 2007, Reynolds, along with David Clarkson, signed a contract extension, keeping him at the club until 2011. He went on to play more than 200 games for Motherwell, with his 100th game being a 2–0 Lanarkshire derby win over Hamilton Accies in November 2008.

In June 2008, it was reported that Rangers had made an offer of £750,000 for Reynolds, which was turned down. Then-Motherwell manager Mark McGhee explained that he wanted to retain the club's better players ahead of their UEFA Cup campaign. Reynolds would stay at Motherwell for another season and stated he would prefer to play in the English Premier League than join either of a Scotland's Old Firm clubs. He went on to make his European debut where he played both legs against Nancy in the first round. In the 2009–10 season, Reynolds played in all six games of Motherwell's Europa League campaign where the club were eventually eliminated by Steaua București. In the league, Reynolds scored four goals during the season against Hibernian, Celtic, Heart of Midlothian and Dundee United. Reynolds later credited McGhee for putting his career on track from "the lowest point in his career".

On 31 August 2010, it was reported that Swansea City had put in a bid for the defender, which was turned down by Motherwell as it did not meet their valuation for the player, who was in the final year of his contract. Manager Craig Brown admitted they need to sell Reynolds to improve their finances. However, Reynolds would remain at the club throughout the summer transfer window. During the season, he scored an own goal in a 2–1 loss against Heart on 14 December 2010 and played his 200th game for Motherwell in a Lanarkshire derby against Hamilton in January 2011.

Sheffield Wednesday
An offer of £100,000 plus additional clauses from Sheffield Wednesday was accepted on 15 January 2011. The deal was completed a day later. After his move, Reynolds said he had made the right decision to join the club and was looking forward to making an impact in English football. Reynolds also stated that a reason for joining the club was to play in front of 20,000 supporters.

Reynolds made his debut in a 2–2 draw against Yeovil Town on 25 January 2011. In his first half-season, he made 7 appearances for the club. The following campaign, he found himself out of the first team and began to struggle to get his place back. He made only ten league appearances for Wednesday during 2011.

Aberdeen
In January 2012, Reynolds was loaned out to Scottish Premier League club Aberdeen, joining up with manager Craig Brown who had previously been his manager at Motherwell. Reynolds, who was brought in as a replacement for Richard Foster, made his debut in a 0–0 draw against Kilmarnock on 14 January 2012. In March, he played twice against his former club (one in the Scottish Cup and the other in the League). On 2 May 2012, Reynolds scored an own goal early on in a game with Hibernian at Pittodrie, which the visitors went on to win 2–1.

After being told by Sheffield Wednesday manager Dave Jones that he was surplus to requirements and won't get first team guarantee, Reynolds returned to Aberdeen on loan for the 2012–13 season. Upon arriving for the second time, Reynolds said he joined Aberdeen instead of Rangers as "it's a strange situation there at the moment", as the Glasgow team had been re-admitted to the bottom tier of the Scottish leagues.

He played his first match of his second loan spell as a substitute in a 2–1 win over St Johnstone on 18 August 2012, and two months later scored his first goal in a 4–1 win over St Mirren. The following month, Aberdeen chief executive Duncan Fraser announced that the club had opened negotiations to sign Reynolds on a permanent deal, with a possible three-year contract on the table. Reynolds left Sheffield Wednesday by mutual consent on 31 January 2013 after returning to the  Owls from his second loan spell with Aberdeen. He immediately rejoined Aberdeen on a free transfer, signing a four-and-a-half-year contract.

Reynolds was appointed vice-captain of Aberdeen for the 2013–14 season. In August 2013, he scored in a 3–1 win against his former club Motherwell. On 28 February 2014, Reynolds signed a new four-year contract extension. At that time, former Aberdeen captain Willie Miller compared Reynolds's central defensive partnership with Russell Anderson to his own successful pairing with Alex McLeish.

The following month, Reynolds started in the 2014 Scottish League Cup Final victory against Inverness Caledonian Thistle, his first domestic honour and Aberdeen's first piece of silverware in 19 years.

In the 2014–15 season, Reynolds featured in six matches in the Europa League and scored his first European goal in the second leg of third round, as Aberdeen lost 3–2 to Real Sociedad.

In September 2017, Reynolds extended his contract with Aberdeen to the summer of 2019. To that date he had made 226 appearances and scored seven goals for the club. Reynolds underwent knee surgery in July 2018, requiring him to stop playing for the rest of the calendar year. He left Aberdeen in January 2019, initially on loan.

Dundee United
On 31 January 2019, Reynolds moved to Dundee United on loan until the end of the 2018–19 season. During his loan spell, he signed a pre-contract agreement with United; his arrival on a three-year contract was confirmed in June 2019, despite the club failing to win promotion. He scored his first goal for Dundee United on 8 August 2020, in a 1–0 win away to his former club Motherwell. On 14 January 2022, it was confirmed that Reynolds had left Dundee United in order to pursue his career elsewhere.

Cove Rangers
Following his release from Dundee United, Reynolds returned to Aberdeenshire, signing an 18-month contract with Scottish League One side Cove Rangers.

International career
Reynolds represented Scotland at the 2007 FIFA U-20 World Cup, scoring a goal against Costa Rica. He has also been capped at under-21 level and played once for the Scotland B side in 2009. On 16 May 2014, Reynolds was called into the senior Scotland squad for the first time, for the friendly against Nigeria. He was recalled to the squad for a 2018 FIFA World Cup qualifier against England in June 2017.

Personal life
Reynolds has become involved in a project to encourage literacy. He attended Our Lady's High School in Motherwell and almost quit football when he was "accepted into almost every top university in Scotland." He was held up as an example to aspiring local footballers (such as future Aberdeen teammate Mikey Devlin who lived on the same street) for achieving academically as well as in sport.

In 2019, while still playing, he completed a degree course in mechanical and offshore engineering.

His father Brian is a former football player and current coach who has also worked at Motherwell as well as at Queen's Park, where his son joined in training sessions at Hampden Park as a child.

Career statistics

Honours

Aberdeen 
 Scottish League Cup: 2013–14; runner-up: 2016–17
Scottish Cup runner-up: 2016–17

Dundee United 
Scottish Championship: 2019–20

Individual 
SPL Young Player of the Month: April 2007
PFA Scotland Team of the Year: 2013–14

References

External links

1987 births
Living people
Footballers from Motherwell
Scottish footballers
Scotland youth international footballers
Scotland under-21 international footballers
Scotland B international footballers
Association football defenders
Motherwell F.C. players
Sheffield Wednesday F.C. players
Aberdeen F.C. players
Dundee United F.C. players
Scottish Premier League players
English Football League players
Scottish Professional Football League players
People educated at Our Lady's High School, Motherwell
Cove Rangers F.C. players